Songs in the Key of Life is the eighteenth studio album by American singer, songwriter and musician Stevie Wonder. A double album, it was released on September 28, 1976, by Tamla Records, a division of Motown. It was recorded primarily at Crystal Sound studio in Hollywood, with some sessions recorded at the Record Plant in Hollywood, the Record Plant in Sausalito, and The Hit Factory in New York City; final mixing was conducted at Crystal Sound. The album has been regarded by music journalists as the culmination of Wonder's "classic period" of recording.

By 1974, Wonder was one of the most successful figures in popular music; his previous albums Music of My Mind, Talking Book, Innervisions, and Fulfillingness' First Finale were all back-to-back critical successes. However, by the end of 1975, Wonder seriously considered quitting the music industry and emigrating to Ghana to aid children with disabilities. When plans for a farewell concert had already begun, Wonder changed his mind and signed a new contract with Motown on August 5, 1975. This outlined a seven-year, seven-album, $37 million deal with full artistic control. At the time, it was the biggest recording deal in history.

Songs in the Key of Life was released as a double LP with a four-song bonus EP. It debuted at number one on the Billboard Pop Albums Chart, becoming only the third album to achieve that feat, and the first by an American artist. Both the lead single "I Wish" and follow-up single "Sir Duke" reached number one on the Billboard Hot 100. The album spent thirteen consecutive weeks at number one on the Billboard 200, becoming the album with the most weeks at number one during the year, and was the second best-selling album of 1977 in the US. In 2005, the album was certified Diamond by the Recording Industry Association of America (RIAA), indicating sales of 5 million units for a double album.

The album won Album of the Year at the 19th Grammy Awards and is the best-selling and most critically acclaimed album of Wonder's career. Widely regarded as his magnum opus and one of the greatest albums in the history of recorded music, many musicians have remarked on the quality of the album and its influence on their own work; indeed, some notable musicians have named it as the greatest album of all time. It was voted number 89 in Colin Larkin's All Time Top 1000 Albums and ranked number 4 on Rolling Stone's list of the 500 Greatest Albums of All Time.  In 2002, the album was inducted into the Grammy Hall of Fame, and in 2005 it was inducted into the National Recording Registry by the Library of Congress, which deemed it "culturally, historically, or aesthetically significant".

Background
By 1976, Stevie Wonder had become one of the most popular figures in R&B and pop music, not only in the U.S., but worldwide. Within a short space of time, the albums Talking Book, Innervisions and Fulfillingness' First Finale were all back-to-back-to-back top five successes, with the latter two winning the Grammy Award for Album of the Year in 1974 and 1975, respectively. In 1975, Wonder became serious about quitting the music industry and emigrating to Ghana to work with handicapped children. He had expressed his anger with the way the U.S. government was running the country. A farewell concert was being considered as the best way to bring down the curtain on his career. Wonder changed his mind and signed a new contract with Motown on August 5, 1975, thinking he was better off making the most of his career. At the time, rival labels such as Arista and Epic were also interested in him. The contract was laid out as a seven-year, seven LP, $37 million deal ($ in  dollars) and gave Wonder full artistic control, making this the largest deal made with a recording star up to that point. Shortly after signing the contract, Wonder took a year off from music.

There was huge anticipation for the new album, which was initially scheduled for release around October 1975. It was delayed on short notice when Wonder felt that further remixing was essential. According to him, Motown's marketing campaign decided to take advantage of the delay by producing "We're almost finished" T-shirts. Work on the new album continued into early 1976. The working title was Let's See Life the Way It Is, before Wonder settled on Songs in the Key of Life. The title would represent the formula of a complex "key of life" and the proposals for indefinite success. The album was released on September 28, 1976, after a two-year wait as a double LP album plus a bonus 7-inch EP titled A Something's Extra (which featured "Saturn", "Ebony Eyes", "All Day Sucker", and "Easy Goin' Evening (My Mama's Call)"), and included a 24-page lyric and credit booklet.

Recording

Wonder recorded the great majority of the album at Crystal Sounds in Hollywood, with Gary Olazabal and studio owner John Fischbach as engineers. Some material was recorded at the Record Plant in Hollywood and the Record Plant in Sausalito. During a period when Crystal Sounds had a prior obligation to record another artist, the production team traveled to the Hit Factory in New York City to work for about six weeks, but only used one basic track from those sessions. As a perfectionist, Wonder spent long hours in the studio for almost every track he recorded. He was "not eating or sleeping, while everyone around him struggled to keep up." According to Wonder, "If my flow is goin', I keep on until I peak." Bassist Nathan Watts remembered getting home at 3 am after very long hours in the studio, only to have Wonder phone to request him return immediately to help with "I Wish".

A total of 130 people worked on the album, but Wonder's preeminence remains evident. Among the musicians who contributed were some legendary figures of R&B, soul, and jazz music: Herbie Hancock played Fender Rhodes on "As", George Benson played electric guitar on "Another Star", and Minnie Riperton and Deniece Williams added backing vocals on "Ordinary Pain". Mike Sembello is a prominent personality throughout the album, playing guitar on several tracks and also co-writing "Saturn" with Wonder. While Wonder wrote most of the songs on the album himself, some of the album's most socially-conscious songs had co-writers: Wonder wrote "Village Ghetto Land" and "Black Man" with Gary Byrd, and he wrote "Have a Talk with God" with his brother Calvin Hardaway.

Critical reception

At the time of the album's release, reporters and music critics, and everyone who had worked on it, traveled to Long View Farm, a recording studio in Massachusetts, for a press preview. Everybody received autographed copies of the album and Wonder gave interviews. Critical reception was immediately positive. The album was viewed as a guided tour through a wide range of musical styles and the life and feelings of the artist. It included recollections of childhood, of first love and lost love. It contained songs about faith and love among all peoples and songs about social justice for the poor and downtrodden.  The Village Voices annual Pazz & Jop critics poll, it was voted as the best album of the year.

From 1973, Wonder's presence at the Grammy Awards ceremonies was consistent – he attended most of the ceremonies and also often performed on stage – but in 1976 he did not attend and was not nominated for any awards, as he had not released any new material during the previous year. When Paul Simon accepted the award for Album of the Year at the 18th Grammy Awards (for Still Crazy After All These Years), he jokingly thanked Stevie for not releasing an album that year, as Wonder had won the award at the two preceding ceremonies (for Innervisions and Fulfillingness’ First Finale). When, a year later, Wonder was again nominated in the category for Songs in the Key of Life (which also received six other nominations), the album was seen as the favorite by many critics to take the award. The other nominees were Breezin’ by George Benson, Chicago X by Chicago, Silk Degrees by Boz Scaggs, and the other favorite, Peter Frampton’s Frampton Comes Alive!, which was also a huge critical and commercial success.

Wonder was again absent from the 19th Grammy Awards ceremony, as he was visiting Africa. In February 1977, he traveled to Nigeria for two weeks, primarily to explore his musical heritage, as he put it. A satellite hook-up was arranged so he could accept his Grammys from across the sea, but when Bette Midler announced the results during the ceremony, the audience was only able to see Wonder at a phone smiling and giving thanks, as the video signal was poor and the audio inaudible. Andy Williams went on to make a public blunder when he asked the blind-since-birth Wonder, “Stevie, can you see us?” In all, Wonder won in four out of the seven categories in which he was nominated at the Grammys that year: Album of the Year, Producer of the Year, Best Male Pop Vocal Performance, and Best Male R&B Vocal Performance (for "I Wish").

Commercial performance
Highly anticipated, the album surpassed all commercial expectations. It debuted at number 1 on the Billboard Pop Albums Chart on October 8, 1976, becoming only the third album in history to achieve that feat (after British singer/composer Elton John's albums Captain Fantastic and the Brown Dirt Cowboy and Rock of the Westies, both from 1975), and the first by an American artist. In Canada, it achieved the same feat, entering the RPM national albums chart at number one on October 16. The album spent thirteen consecutive weeks at number one in the US, eleven of which were in 1976, making it the album with the most weeks at number one during that year. During those eleven weeks, Songs in the Key of Life managed to block four other albums from reaching the top: Boz Scaggs’s Silk Degrees, Earth, Wind & Fire's Spirit, Led Zeppelin's soundtrack for The Song Remains the Same and Rod Stewart's A Night on the Town. On January 15, 1977, the album finally dropped to number two behind Eagles' Hotel California, and it fell to number four the following week, but on January 29 it returned to the top for a fourteenth and final week. By the end of its run, it had spent 35 weeks inside the top ten of the Billboard albums chart and was on the chart for a total of 80 weeks. The album also saw longevity atop the Billboard R&B/Black Albums chart, spending 20 non-consecutive weeks at number one.

The album became the second-best selling album of 1977 in the US (behind only Fleetwood Mac's blockbuster Rumours), and was the highest selling R&B/Soul album on the Billboard Year-End chart that same year. It was certified Diamond by the RIAA in 2005, indicating sales of 5 million copies in the US alone (though a Diamond certification is awarded for sales of 10 million units, the RIAA counts each individual record or disc included with an album as a separate unit).

Songs in the Key of Life was also the most successful of Wonder's albums in terms of singles, the first of which, the upbeat "I Wish", was released in November 1976, over a month after the album was released. On January 15, 1977, the song reached number one on the Billboard R&B chart, where it spent five weeks. Seven days after, it also reached the summit of the Billboard Hot 100, although it spent only one week at number one. The track became an international top 10 single, and reached number five in the UK. "I Wish" became one of Wonder's standards and remains one of his most sampled songs. The follow-up single, the jazzy "Sir Duke", was released in March 1977 and surpassed the commercial success of "I Wish". It also reached number one on the Billboard Hot 100 (where it spent three weeks, starting on May 21) and the R&B chart (for one week, starting on May 28), but it reached number two in the UK, where it was kept from the top spot by the song "Free" by Deniece Williams, who provided backing vocals on Wonder's album.

Released during the second half of 1977, as sales for the album began to decline, the last two singles from Songs in the Key of Life failed to match the success of "I Wish" and "Sir Duke". "Another Star" was released in August and reached number 32 on the Hot 100 (number 18 on the R&B chart, and number 29 in the UK), and "As" came out two months later, peaking at number 36 on both the Pop and R&B charts. Though not released as a single, "Isn't She Lovely" received wide radio airplay and became one of Wonder's most popular songs. David Parton's cover of the song, recorded and released soon after Wonder's album, gave him a top 10 hit in the UK in early 1977.

Legacy and influence
Over time, Songs in the Key of Life became a standard, and it is considered Wonder's signature album, even by Wonder himself: "Of all the albums," he told Q magazine for their April 1995 issue, "Songs in the Key of Life I'm most happy about. Just the time, being alive then. To be a father and then… letting go and letting God give me the energy and strength I needed." It is also often cited as one of the greatest albums in popular music history. For example, in 2001, the TV network VH1 named it the seventh greatest album of all time; in 2003, it was ranked number 56 on Rolling Stone Magazine's list of the 500 greatest albums of all time (it was number 57 on the 2012 version of the list, and number 4 on the 2020 edition); it was included in the book 1001 Albums You Must Hear Before You Die; and in April 2008, it was voted the "Top Album of All Time" by the Yahoo! Music Playlist Blog, using a formula that combined four parameters – "Album Staying Power Value + Sales Value + Critical Rating Value + Grammy Award Value".

Many musicians have remarked on the quality of the album and its influence on their own work. Elton John said, in his notes about Wonder for Rolling Stones 2003 list of "The Immortals – The Greatest Artists of All Time" (in which Wonder was ranked number 15): "Let me put it this way: wherever I go in the world, I always take a copy of Songs in the Key of Life. For me, it's the best album ever made, and I'm always left in awe after I listen to it."
In an interview with Ebony magazine, Michael Jackson called Songs in the Key of Life his favorite Stevie Wonder album. Kanye West, in a 2005 interview with Clash, remarked: "I'm not trying to compete with what's out there now. I'm really trying to compete with Innervisions and Songs in the Key of Life. It sounds musically blasphemous to say something like that, but why not set that as your bar?" George Michael cited the album as his favorite of all time. He released a live recording of "Love's in Need of Love Today" as a B-side to "Father Figure" in 1987 and performed the song on his Faith tour the next year, performed "Village Ghetto Land" at the Nelson Mandela 70th Birthday Tribute in 1988, covered "Pastime Paradise" and "Knocks Me Off My Feet" on his 1991 Cover to Cover tour, and (with Mary J. Blige) had a hit single in 1999 with a cover of "As".

Many R&B singers have praised the album: Mariah Carey generally names it as one of her favorites, and Whitney Houston remarked on its influence on her singing (at Houston's request, the album was played throughout the photo sessions for her compilation album Whitney: The Greatest Hits, as can be seen on the home video release that accompanied that album). Its importance has also been recognized by heavy metal musicians, with singer Phil Anselmo describing a live performance of Songs in the Key of Life as "a living, breathing miracle".

The album's tracks have provided numerous samples for rap and hip-hop artists. "Pastime Paradise", which itself drew on the first eight notes and four chords of J.S. Bach's Prelude No. 2 in C minor (BWV 847), was reworked by Coolio as "Gangsta's Paradise" in 1995. That same year, smooth jazz artist Najee recorded a cover album titled Najee Plays Songs from the Key of Life, which is based entirely on Wonder's album. In 1999, Will Smith used "I Wish" as the base for his US number-one single "Wild Wild West" (Smith's song repeated the main melody of "I Wish" as a riff and re-formed some of Wonder's lyrics).

In December 2013, Wonder did a live concert performance of the entire album at the Nokia Theater in Los Angeles. The event was his 18th annual House Full of Toys Benefit Concert, and featured some of the singers and musicians that are featured on the original album, as well as several from the contemporary music scene. Then, in November 2014 Wonder began performing the entire album in a series of concert dates in the US and Canada. The start of the tour coincided with the 38th anniversary of the release of Songs in the Key of Life.

Track listing

Original release

A Something's Extra EP
Original LP editions included a bonus 7-inch EP, titled "A Something's Extra", containing four bonus tracks.

Personnel
Credits adapted from Songs in the Key of Life liner notes.

Stevie Wonder – lead vocals, keyboards, harmonica, drums, percussion, synth bass, arrangement, composer, producer
Nathan Watts – bass guitar (4-6, 16, 17, 19, 21), percussion (14), handclaps (16)
Raymond Pounds – drums (4-6)
Greg Phillinganes – keyboards (4, 11, 12, 18)
Michael Sembello – lead guitar (4, 5, 10, 18, 20)
Ben Bridges – rhythm guitar (4, 5, 9, 18, 20)
Eddie "Bongo" Brown – collinga (1)
Shirley Brewer – backing vocals (4), lead vocals (10 – "Reply" section), handclaps (11), percussion (14)
Josie James – backing vocals (4, 17)
Michael Gray – backing vocals (4)
Artece May – backing vocals (4), handclaps (11)
Hank Redd – alto saxophone (5, 6, 10, 13, 17)
Trevor Lawrence – tenor saxophone (5, 6, 17)
Raymond Maldonado – trumpet (5, 6, 17), percussion (8)
Steve Madaio – trumpet (5, 6, 13, 17)
Renee Hardaway – backing vocals (6), percussion (14)
Bobbye Hall – percussion (8)
West Angeles Church of God Choir – backing vocals (8)
Hare Krishna – backing vocals (8)
Ronnie Foster – organ (9)
Nastee Latimer – percussion (9)
Minnie Riperton – backing vocals (10)
Mary Lee Whitney – backing vocals (10, 16)
Deniece Williams – backing vocals (10)
Syreeta Wright – backing vocals (10)
Linda Lawrence – backing vocals (10 – "Reply" section)
Terry Hendricks – backing vocals (10 – "Reply" section)
Sundray Tucker – backing vocals (10 – "Reply" section)
Charity McCrary – backing vocals (10 – "Reply" section)
Linda McCrary – backing vocals (10 – "Reply" section)
Madelaine "Gypsie" Jones – backing vocals (10 – "Reply" section)
Josette Valentino – handclaps (11, 16), percussion (14)
Dave Henson – handclaps (11, 16)
Brenda Barrett – handclaps (11)
Colleen Carleton – handclaps (11)
Carole Cole – handclaps (11)
Nelson Hayes – handclaps (11)
Edna Orso – handclaps (11)
Tucker – handclaps (11)
Susaye Greene – backing vocals (12)
George Bohanon – trombone (13)
Glenn Ferris – trombone (13)
Al Fann Theatrical Ensemble – verbal replies (13)
Charles Brewer – percussion (14)
Nelson Hayes – percussion (14)
Marietta Waters – percussion (14)
John Fischbach – percussion (14)
Amale Mathews – percussion (14)
Dorothy Ashby – harp (15)
Greg Brown – drums (16)
Herbie Hancock – keyboards (16), handclaps (16)
Dean Parks – guitar (16)
Yolanda Simmons – handclaps (16)
Bobbi Humphrey – flute (17)
George Benson – guitar (17), backing vocals (17)
Nathan Alford, Jr. – percussion (17)
Carmello Hungria Garcia – timbales (17)
Jim Horn - saxophone (19)
Peter "Sneaky Pete" Kleinow – steel guitar (19)
W. G. Snuffy Walden – lead guitar (20)
Carolyn Dennis – backing vocals (20)

Charts

Weekly charts

Year-end charts

Certifications

See also
List of number-one albums of 1976 (U.S.)
List of number-one albums of 1977 (U.S.)
List of number-one R&B albums of 1976 (U.S.)
List of number-one R&B albums of 1977 (U.S.)

Notes

References

Further reading 
 
Jumping Jamboree at Time
Album Review at BBC Music
Reviews at SuperSeventies
Accolades: Songs in the Keys of Life at Acclaimed Music
Audio streams: WBEZ program 'Extensions' broadcast a 3 hour special commemorating the album's 30th anniversary

External links
 

Stevie Wonder albums
Tamla Records albums
1976 albums
Grammy Hall of Fame Award recipients
Grammy Award for Album of the Year
Grammy Award for Best Male Pop Vocal Performance
United States National Recording Registry recordings
Albums produced by Stevie Wonder
Albums recorded at Record Plant (Los Angeles)
Avant-pop albums
United States National Recording Registry albums